Gregory Abbott, known professionally as Reverend Gadget, is a steel fabrication artist, craftsman, prop builder and television personality based in Los Angeles, California. He is best known to television audiences as part of the build team on the short-lived Discovery Channel series Big!, and has more recently been part of their other series Monster House and Smash Lab. He is currently working with EarthxTV  on his own series Reverend Gadget's Garage – also known as Gadget's World – in which he shows his advocation of alternative energy sources by converting gasoline-powered vehicles to electricity.

Abbott took the name "Reverend Gadget" to reflect both his craftsman works and the fact that he has been an ordained minister since 1986. According to his website, he currently holds 10 Guinness World Records for his works, some of which were with the Big! build team. He was interviewed in the documentary Revenge of the Electric Car.

External links
Left Coast EV Personal Website]

Crashed Tesla's Become Classic Electric Cars by LA Times
Meet Reverend Gadget by Press Telegram
Burning Man Mutant Vehicles by The Drive
Mechanic Looks To Start An Auto Revolution by CBS News
More On Reverend Gadget and Left Coast by Auto Blog
Who's Resurrecting the Electric Car by LA Weekly

Living people
Year of birth missing (living people)
Discovery Channel people
Guinness World Records
Sustainable energy